Winkler is an unincorporated community in Riley County, Kansas, United States.

History
A post office was opened in Winkler in 1874, and remained in operation until it was discontinued in 1960, although at first the post office was called Winkler's Mills.

Education
The community is served by Blue Valley USD 384 public school district.

References

Further reading

External links
 Riley County maps: Current, Historic, KDOT

Unincorporated communities in Riley County, Kansas
Unincorporated communities in Kansas